This was the first edition of the tournament at the Challenger level.

Ken Skupski and Neal Skupski won the title after defeating Matt Reid and John-Patrick Smith 7–6(7–1), 2–6, [10–7] in the final.

Seeds

Draw

References
 Main Draw

Nottingham Open - Men's Doubles
2017 Men's Doubles